Mathias Kolle is a German physicist specializing in bio-inspired optics, optoelectronics and materials science and head of the Laboratory for Biologically Inspired Photonic Engineering at the Massachusetts Institute of Technology (MIT). He currently holds the Rockwell Career Development Professorship and is Associate Professor in the Mechanical Engineering Department (MECHE) at MIT.

Education 
Kolle graduated from the Goethe-Gymnasium in Gera in 2000.  He then completed his trinational physics studies with a Bachelor of Science and a Master of Science at the Saarland University in Saarbrücken. He also studied at the Henri Poincaré University in Nancy and at the University of Luxembourg in Luxembourg. After completing his studies, Kolle moved to the University of Cambridge in Cambridge in 200 d did his doctorate in 2010 under Ullrich Steiner on the subject of "Photonic structures inspired by nature". As a Humboldt Postdoctoral Research Fellow, Kolle conducted research from 2010 to 2013 at the School of Engineering and Applied Sciences at Harvard University before being appointed Associate Professor at the Massachusetts Institute of Technology in Massachusetts in 2013.

Teaching 
At MIT, in addition to seminars, Kolle holds the basic course on measurement and instrumentation.

Memberships and expert work 
Since 2016, Kolle is also a consultant for the International Scientific Committee for the Living Light Conference

Publications 
Kolle is (as of 2021) the author or co-author of over 40 scientific articles in international journals. According to the Web of Science, his work has been cited over 3,500 times, resulting in an h-index of 36

His most cited publications include the articles "A highly conspicuous mineralized composite photonic architecture in the translucent shell of the blue-rayed limpet" (Nature Communications), "Multifunctionality of Chiton Biomineralized Armor with an Integrated Visual System" (Science), "Bio- inspired band-gap tunable elastic optical multilayer fibers", or "Structural Color in Animals", which he published in collaboration with researchers such as Joanna Aizenberg or Eric Mazur.

His dissertation on “Photonic Structures Inspired by Nature” was published as a book by Springer Verlag.

References 

Year of birth missing (living people)
Living people
German physicists
MIT Engineers
People from Gera